Shakuni Choudhury is an Indian politician who is a founding member of Samata Party. He was elected to the Lok Sabha, lower house of the Parliament of India from Khagaria , Bihar as member of the Samata Party. Chaudhary has been known for political defection and has remained Deputy Speaker in the Bihar assembly. He was a former loyal to the Rashtriya Janata Dal (RJD)  but left the party on the ground of it promoting the interest of Lalu Prasad Yadav's family. The defection  happened soon after his son Samrat Chaudhary orchestrated a split in RJD by alienating thirteen MLAs to seek recognition as separate splinter group.

Personal life 
He was born on 4 January 1941 in Lakhanpur village of Munger. He is married to Parvati Devi. Chaudhary belongs to Kushwaha community and had claimed to hold significant hold over his community in the state.
His ancestral village is in Lakhanpur in Tarapur block of Munger district. His son Samrat Chaudhary is Member of Legislative Council from the Bhartiya Janata Party. Chaudhary has served in Indian Army for 15 years after that he joined active politics.

Political career 

Chaudhary was elected to Bihar Legislative Assembly from Tarapur constituency in Munger district of Bihar in 1985 as Independent politician. Later joined Indian National Congress and won the same seat in 1990 Bihar Legislative Assembly election. In 1995 Bihar Legislative Assembly election, he shifted allegiance to Samata Party of George Fernandes.

In 1995 Bihar Assembly elections, the Tarapur constituency came into limelight, when the candidate of Indian National Congress, Sachidanand Singh was attacked by grenades along with his supporters. Singh was taken to a hospital at Tarapur; the hospital was subsequently attacked and Singh was assassinated. In these subsequent incidents, nine people were killed. A total of thirty three people were accused in this case, among them, Chaudhary was one of the main accused. However, the investigations were halted after some time. Soon after this incident, in the counting of votes, Chaudhary was declared winner in the 1995 Assembly elections.

In 1998, he was elected to Lok Sabha from Khagaria, Bihar as member of the Samata Party by defeating Anil Kumar Yadav of Rashtriya Janata Dal. He was elected to Bihar Legislative Assembly in 2000 Bihar Election from Tarapur constituency as a member of Rashtriya Janata Dal and was made a minister in Rabri Devi cabinet.

In 2015, he joined the rebellion of Jitan Ram Manjhi and joined Hindustani Awam Morcha a party created by Manjhi after his exit from Janata Dal (United). He was made Bihar State President of Hindustani Awam Morcha. He again contests in 2015 Bihar Election from Tarapur constituency as a member of Hindustani Awam Morcha but lost to  Mewalal Chaudhary of Janata Dal (United) by about 12,000 votes. After the dismal performance of the party, he quit the Party chief position and politics.

However in 2019 Chaudhary addressed a meeting of BJP leaders and gave indication of joining active politics once again with the membership of BJP.

References

External links
Official biographical sketch in Parliament of India website

India MPs 1998–1999
1941 births
Lok Sabha members from Bihar
Samata Party politicians
Living people
Janata Dal politicians
Rashtriya Janata Dal politicians